East 9th–North Coast (signed as North Coast) is a station on the RTA Waterfront Line in Cleveland, Ohio. The station is located west of East 9th Street, south of the Cleveland Memorial Shoreway, and north of the CSX railroad tracks. Entrance to the station is from the west side of East 9th Street. It serves the North Coast Harbor attractions, as well as the northern portion of downtown.

The station has fare collection booths for the collection of fares from passengers entering toward Tower City Center and leaving toward South Harbor. When the station is unmanned, fares are collected on the trains.

The station was designed by the firm of Robert P. Madison International, founded by the prominent African American architect. It was designed to harmonize with the style of the nearby Rock and Roll Hall of Fame, for which the Madison firm was also associate architects.

History

The station opened on July 10, 1996, when light rail service was extended  from Tower City along The Flats and along the Lake Erie waterfront. This extension was designated the Waterfront Line, although it is actually an extension of the Blue and Green Lines, as trains leaving this station toward Tower City continue along the Blue or Green Line routes to Shaker Heights.

Station layout

Notable places nearby
 North Coast Harbor
 Rock and Roll Hall of Fame and Museum
 Great Lakes Science Center
 Steamship William G. Mather Museum
 North Point Office Building and Tower
 Willard Park
 Cleveland City Hall

Artwork
When the station opened, it included three separate art projects incorporated into the design:

A 49-foot porcelain mosaic tile rug called "Welcome Mat" is set in the floor of the station's entrance. Designed by local artist Angelica Pozo, it resembles an Oriental rug with its multiple borders around a separately designed inner area. The images in the mosaic involve the hand, which the artist chose to symbolize the hands of craftsman and skilled workers who built the city. A palm makes up the inner-design of one half of the rug, and the mat's middle border consists of a string of hands in different flesh tones to denote Cleveland's ethnic diversity clasped in a handshake, which, according to Pozo, represent "the cooperation and working together that helped Cleveland get where it is."
A sculpture named "Transit Relief" was designed by members of the RAM design group, comprising Kahlil I. Pedizisai, Kevin Jerome Everson, E. Dominique Brown, and Johnny Coleman. It is an aluminum, multimedia relief sculpture that is part RTA bus-part RTA train. The windows of the vehicles are video monitors showing passing images along Cleveland's streets, such as youths shooting basketball in a park, shoppers scurrying through Public Square and even the train and bus drivers in various poses. Pedizisai noted, "We're creating a visual bibliography of Cleveland."
The final piece of art is a glass wall designed by Henry Halem and Brinsley Tyrrell. Four neon lights run within the wall and cast a soft glow on its image of an oil carrier. The carrier's body is made up of 14 panels, each of which depicts a story about Cleveland.

Gallery

References

External links

 Photos of North Coast Station from subwaynut.com
 Images of North Coast Station by Robert P. Madison International, Inc.

Waterfront Line (RTA Rapid Transit)
Railway stations in the United States opened in 1996
Railway stations closed in 2020
1996 establishments in Ohio